Ludwig Bemelmans (April 27, 1898 – October 1, 1962) was an Austrian-American writer and illustrator of children's books and adult novels. He is known best for the Madeline picture books. Six were published, the first in 1939.

Early life
Bemelmans was born to the Belgian painter Lambert Bemelmans and the German Frances Fischer in Meran, Austria-Hungary (now Italy). His father owned a hotel. He grew up in Gmunden on the Traunsee in Upper Austria. His first language was French and his second German.

In 1904, his father left his wife and Ludwig's governess, both of whom were pregnant with his children, for another woman, after which his mother took Ludwig and his brother to her native city of Regensburg, Germany. Bemelmans had difficulty in school, as he hated the German style of discipline. He was apprenticed to his uncle Hans Bemelmans at a hotel in Austria. In a 1941 New York Times interview with Robert van Gelder, he related that while an apprentice, he was regularly beaten and even whipped by the headwaiter. According to Bemelmans, he finally warned the headwaiter that if he was whipped again he would retaliate with a gun. The headwaiter ignored his warning, whipped him, and Bemelmans reportedly shot and seriously wounded him in retaliation. Given the choice between reform school and emigration to the United States, he chose the latter. It is likely this was one of Bemelman's famous yarns, since in John Bemelmans Marciano's biography of his grandfather, he relates a simpler story: recognizing that Ludwig was an incorrigible boy, his uncle offered him the choice of going to America (where his father now lived), or going to reform school.

In America
He spent the next several years working at hotels and restaurants in the US. In 1917, he joined the U.S. Army, but was not sent to Europe because of his German origins. He did become an officer, and was promoted to Second Lieutenant. He writes of his experiences in the Army in the book, My War With the United States. In 1918, he became a US citizen.

In the 1920s, Bemelmans tried to become an artist and painter while working at hotels, but had substantial difficulties. In 1926, he quit his job at the Ritz-Carlton in New York to become a full-time cartoonist.  His cartoon series The Thrilling Adventures of the Count Bric a Brac was dropped from the New York World after six months. He associated with Ervine Metzl, a commercial artist and illustrator who is variously described as Bemelmans's friend, "agent", and "ghost artist".

Writing career

In the early 1930s Bemelmans met May Massee, the children's book editor at Viking Press, who became a sort of partner. He began to publish children's books, beginning with Hansi in 1934. He published the first Madeline book in 1939; after being rejected by Viking, it was published by Simon & Schuster. The book was a great success. Bemelmans did not write a second Madeline book until 1953, when he published Madeline’s Rescue. Four more books in the series were subsequently published while he was alive, and one more was published posthumously in 1999.

Up until the early 1950s, the artistic media he worked in were pen and ink, water color, and gouache. As he describes in his autobiographical My Life in Art, he had avoided oil painting because it did not permit him to produce artistic pieces quickly. But at this point in his life, he wanted to master the richness of oil painting. To this end, he set out to buy a property in Paris that would serve as a serious, full-blown art studio. In 1953, he fell in love with a small bistro in Paris,  in the Île de la Cité, and bought it, intending to convert it into a studio. He painted murals therein, but the project was a disaster owing to French bureaucracy, and after two years of frustration and disappointment, he unloaded it by selling it to Michel Valette, who converted it into a notable cabaret.

Bemelmans also wrote a number of adult books, including travel, humorous works and novels, as well as movie scripts. The latter included Yolanda and the Thief. While spending time in Hollywood, he became a close friend of interior decorator Elsie de Wolfe, Lady Mendl.

A mural on the walls of the Carlyle Hotel's Bemelmans Bar in New York City, Central Park, is his only artwork on display to the public. He painted the children's dining room on Aristotle Onassis's yacht Christina (now the Christina O), for Christina Onassis, the young daughter of the magnate.

A collection of his short writings was published in 2004 as When you lunch with the Emperor mainly extracted from previous works which included My War with the United States (1937), Life Class (1938), Small Beer (1939), Hotel Splendide (1941),  I Love You, I Love You, I Love You (1942) and “Bemelman’s Italian Holiday” (1961) a collection of travel essays that originally appeared in the magazine, Holiday (magazine), to which Bemelman had been a consistent contributor.

Madeline series
Each Madeline story begins: "In an old house in Paris, that was covered with vines, lived twelve little girls in two straight lines... the smallest one was Madeline." The girls are cared for by Miss Clavel. She is likely a nun, as some French orders called themselves Madames, particularly that of St. Madeleine Sophie Barat, after which this convent school seems to be modeled; and "Mrs." would not be an appropriate equivalent in English. Some have argued that Miss Clavel's apparel looks more like that of a nurse (although why a nurse is working in what appears to be a Paris convent school is not explained).

Other characters include Pepito, son of the Spanish ambassador, who lives next door; Lord Cucuface, owner of the house; and Genevieve, a dog who rescues Madeline from drowning in the second book. Bemelmans published six Madeline stories in his lifetime, five as picture books and one in a magazine. A seventh was discovered after his death and published posthumously:

Madeline, 1939: in which Madeline must have her appendix removed.
Madeline's Rescue, 1953: in which Madeline is rescued from drowning by a dog (later named Genevieve). Winner of the Caldecott Medal for U.S. picture book illustration.
Madeline and the Bad Hat, 1956: in which the "bad hat" is Pepito, the Spanish ambassador's son, whose cruel antics outrage Madeline.
Madeline and the Gypsies, 1959: in which Madeline and Pepito have an adventure at a circus.
Madeline in London, 1961: in which Pepito moves to London, and Madeline and the girls go to visit him.
Madeline's Christmas, 1985: in which everyone in the house catches cold, except Madeline. (First published in McCall's in 1956).
Madeline in America and Other Holiday Tales, 1999: in which Madeline inherits a fortune from her American great-grandfather. The book also reveals Madeline's full name, Madeline Fogg.

Adaptations
The first book, Madeline, was adapted as an Academy Award-nominated 1952 short animated cartoon directed by Robert Cannon for UPA and released by Columbia Pictures, also titled Madeline.
Between 1988 and 2002, an animated Madeline series was made for television (plus one direct-to-video film Madeline: Lost in Paris), with the narration in rhyming style read by Christopher Plummer.
 A live-action Madeline film based on several of the books appeared in 1998, directed by Daisy von Scherler Mayer and starring Hatty Jones as Madeline, Frances McDormand as Miss Clavel, and Nigel Hawthorne as Lord Covington.
 Bemelmans's first novel, Madeline, was briefly satirized on a February 2020 episode of Saturday Night Live by comedian and drag performer Ru Paul.

Now I Lay Me Down to Sleep
Bemelmans novel Now I Lay Me Down to Sleep (1943) was adapted by Elaine Ryan for the stage in 1949. The production was produced and directed by Hume Cronyn and combined professional actors with drama students at Stanford University. Performed at Stanford's Memorial Theatre during July 1949, the production starred Jessica Tandy and Akim Tamiroff, with Jeanne Bates, Feodor Chaliapin, Milton Parsons and Roberta Haynes as the supporting professionals.

Cronyn sold the rights for his staging of the play to new producers Nancy Stern and George Nichols III, who after a tryout in Philadelphia, took it to Broadway. The production opened at the Broadhurst Theatre on March 2, 1950. It starred Fredric March as the General and his wife Florence Eldridge as Miss Graves, with Jacqueline Dalya, Milton Parsons, Henry Lascoe, Rick Jason, Booth Colman, Stefan Schnabel, Charles Chaplin Jr., and many others. Bemelmans was involved with the design of the production and present for the tryouts and Broadway performances.

As with many of the author's novels, Now I Lay Me Down to Sleep consists of a great many character sketches, location changes, and improbable events. Critc John Chapman identified this writing style as the ultimate problem with the stage production:
If anybody is to be reprimanded in this dispatch, it probably should be Mr. Bemelmans for being such a loose and dizzy writer--- but this would be impolite, impertinent and ungrateful, for this gay, raffish author of Now I Lay Me Down to Sleep wrote a story which is a gem of impish, sophisticated and sardonic humor. When Miss Ryan set out to translate his verbal whimseys into the more solid statements of the stage, she handed herself a whale of a job.
Reviewer Louis Scheaffer held the same opinion about the difficulty in adapting Bemelmans for the stage, recognizing that the author's characters are nothing like what theatregoers are used to, and the course of events won't fit neatly into the usual genres. But he also held a high opinion of Bemelmans writing:
A curious, beguiling combination of innocence and sophistication, of sweet humor and shrewd, worldly insight, Bemelmans has a sunny tolerance for his fellow creature's private or personal failings that illuminates all of his writings and goes far beyond the little gray virtues generally suggested by the word "tolerance".
Despite the appreciation for Bemelmans writing by New York critics, Now I Lay Me Down to Sleep lasted for only 44 performances, closing on April 8, 1950.

Personal life
Bemelmans is said to have met his future wife, Madeleine "Mimi" Freund, as a model in Metzl's studio. They had one daughter, Barbara, and three grandchildren, Paul Marciano, James Marciano, and John Bemelmans Marciano.

Bemelmans died in New York of pancreatic cancer, aged 64 and was buried in Arlington National Cemetery.

Books 

 1934: Hansi
 1936: The Golden Basket
 1937: My War with the United States
 1937: The Castle Number Nine
 1938: Life Class – An autobiographical sketch.
 1938: Quito Express (travel book)
 1939: Madeline
 1939: Small Beer (humorous memoirs based on his experiences in Europe and Hollywood)
 1940: Fifi
 1941: At Your Service
 1941: Hotel Splendide
 1941: The Donkey Inside
 1942: Rosebud
 1942: I Love You, I Love You, I Love You
 1943: Now I Lay Me Down to Sleep
 1945: The Blue Danube
 1946: Hotel Bemelmans
 1947: A Tale of Two Glimps
 1947: Dirty Eddie
 1948: The Best of Times: An Account of Europe Revisited
 1949: The Eye of God
 1950: Sunshine: A Story about the City of New York
 1952: How to Travel Incognito
 1952: The Happy Place
 1953: Father, Dear Father
 1953: Madeline's Rescue
 1953: The Borrowed Christmas
 1954: The High World
 1955: Parsley
 1955: To the One I Love the Best – Bemelmans narrates his friendship with Elsie de Wolfe, Lady Mendl.
 1956: Madeline and the Bad Hat
 1957: The Woman of My Life
 1958: My Life in Art
 1959: Madeline and the Gypsies
 1960: Welcome Home!
 1960: Are You Hungry, Are You Cold
 1960: How to Travel To Europe All to Yourself
 1961: Italian Holiday
 1961: Madeline in London
 1962: Marina
 1962: On Board Noah's Ark
 1963: The Street Where the Heart Lies 
 1964: La Bonne Table. Excerpts and essays involving food and drink, edited by Donald and Eleanor Friede
 1966: The Elephant Cutlet 
 1985: Tell Them It Was Wonderful: Selected Writings (compilation of various autobiographical stories, published posthumously)
 1985: Madeline's Christmas (published 1956 in McCall's)
 1999: Madeline in America and Other Holiday Tales
 2004: Hotel Bemelmans (introduction by Anthony Bourdain), Overlook Press, New York
 2004: When You Lunch with the Emperor: The Adventures Of Ludwig Bemelmans (introduction by Andrew Goodfellow) Overlook Press, New York

References

External links 

 "The Man Who Dreamed Up Madeline", Smithsonian Magazine
 
 Ludwig Bemelmans at the Arlington National Cemetery
 Ludwig Bemelmans at Library of Congress Authorities — with catalog records

1898 births
1962 deaths
American children's writers 
Writers who illustrated their own writing
Caldecott Medal winners
American children's book illustrators
Newbery Honor winners
Madeline
Austro-Hungarian emigrants to the United States
People from Gmunden
People from Merano 
People from the County of Tyrol 
Burials at Arlington National Cemetery
20th-century American writers
21st-century American writers
Deaths from cancer in New York (state)
Deaths from pancreatic cancer